Alberta Provincial Highway No. 10, commonly referred to as Highway 10, is a  highway in southern Alberta, Canada that forms a part of Hoo Doo Trail. It is located wholly within the Town of Drumheller as a result of the former City of Drumheller's amalgamation with the Municipal District of Badlands No. 7 on January 1, 1998. It begins at Highway 9 in the heart of Drumheller and extends southeast along the Red Deer River where it passes through Rosedale, then crosses Highway 56 and travels through East Coulee. It ends by splitting off into Highways 570, 564, and 569.

Route description
The highway continues for another  and enters Rosedale where the limit again reduces to 50 km/h. Just prior to crossing the Red Deer River, Highway 10X splits to the southwest from the combined Highway 10/56, paralleling the Rosebud River.

Highway 10/56 continues across the Rosebud River, exiting Rosedale where the speed limit again increases to 100 km/h. East of Rosedale, Highway 56 splits due south toward Dalum and Hussar, while Highway 10 continues to the southeast to Cambria after which it crosses the Red Deer River. Highway 849 then splits to the north en route to Michichi and Highway 10 continues east paralleling the river, now on its north bank. Highway 573 is the next  to split from Highway 10. It proceeds due east while Highway 10 continues southeast through the scenic river valley to Lehigh and East Coulee. East of Lehigh, the road continues east along the north river bank to Dorothy as Highway 570, while Highway 10 veers to the south concurrent with Highway 569 to cross the river.

Major intersections 

Starting from the west end of Highway 10.  The entire route is in Drumheller.

Highway 10X 

Following the amalgamation of the former City of Drumheller with the Municipal District of Badlands No. 7 on January 1, 1998, the entire highway falls within the Town of Drumheller. The road follows the course of the Rosebud River through a 100–150 m deep canyon. Nine bridges lead the road from one side of the river to the other, and most of the bridges are paralleled by railroad bridges of a presently abandoned track that used to cart coal from the Wayne mine. At its end, Highway 10X continues as Excelsior Avenue, which crosses the Rosebud River twice more, before splitting into Range Road 195A and Township Road 280A.

Major intersections

References 

010
Drumheller